The Impulse is an Australian sailing dinghy that was designed by Arthur Caldwell as a one-design racer and first built in 1975.

Production
The design was originally intended as a wooden boat for amateur construction, but has more recently been manufactured of fibreglass. In the past it was built by Tim Wilson Yacht Design, but that company is out of business. Today it is built by Formula Sailcraft (now known as the Dinghy Shop) in Williamstown, Victoria, Australia. Production started in 1975 and the type remains in production.

Design
The Impulse is a recreational sailboat, built predominantly of wood or fibreglass. It has a catboat rig, a raked stem, a vertical transom, a transom-hung rudder controlled by a tiller and a retractable centreboard. It displaces .

Operational history
The boat is supported by a class club, the Australian Impulse Sailing Association, which organizes racing events.

See also
List of sailing boat types

Similar sailboats
Laser (dinghy)

References

External links

Dinghies
1970s sailboat type designs
Sailboat type designs by Arthur Caldwell
Sailboat types built by Formula Sailcraft
Sailboat types built by Tim Wilson Yacht Design